The Police Officer Joseph P. Olivieri Jr. Memorial Bridge is a highway overpass in North Hills in the Town of North Hempstead in Nassau County, on Long Island, in New York, United States. It carries New Hyde Park Road over the Long Island Expressway (Interstate 495). It is named in honor of Joseph P. Olivieri Jr., a police officer who was killed nearby on the line of duty.

Description 
The bridge was built in 2000, replacing an older span. It is of a box beam/girder design and is made of prestressed concrete.

In 2013, the bridge was named the Joseph P. Olivieri Memorial Bridge in honor of Officer Joseph P. Olivieri, who was killed on the line of duty nearby when a truck crashed into his vehicle. The bill which proposed naming the bridge was signed and ultimately approved by Governor Andrew M. Cuomo.

The bridge is located at 40°46'07.1"N 73°41'30.2"W.

The bridge's New York State bridge identification number is 1049019.

See also 

 Police Officer Michael J. Califano Memorial Bridge – Another bridge spanning the Long Island Expressway within Nassau County.

References 

Town of North Hempstead, New York
Bridges in Nassau County, New York
Bridges completed in 2000